Midmar Nature Reserve, also known as Midmar Dam Nature Reserve, is a protected area around Midmar Dam on the Umgeni River. It is situated near to Howick in KwaZulu-Natal, South Africa.

Activities 
Include water sports, cycling, walking, game viewing and angling. Midmar hosts the annual Midmar Mile, a large open-water swimming event.

See also 
 Protected areas of South Africa

References 
https://web.archive.org/web/20091023175409/http://www.kznwildlife.com/site/ecotourism/accommodation/allaccommodation/Midmar/
http://www.kznwildlife.com/index.php/component/content/category/131-midmar-dam.html

Nature reserves in South Africa